Monocarboxylate transporter 8 (MCT8) is an active transporter protein that in humans is encoded by the SLC16A2 gene.

Function 

MCT8 actively transports a variety of iodo-thyronines including the thyroid hormones T3 and T4.

Clinical significance 

A genetic disorder (discovered in 2003 and 2004) is caused by mutation in the transporter of thyroid hormone, MCT8, also known as SLC16A2, is believed to be account for a significant fraction of the undiagnosed neurological disorders (usually resulting in hypotonic/floppy infants with delayed milestones). This genetic defect was known as Allan–Herndon–Dudley syndrome (since 1944) without knowing its actual cause. It has been shown mutated in cases of X-linked leukoencephalopathy. Some of the symptoms for this disorder as are follows: normal to slightly elevated TSH, elevated T3 and reduced T4 (ratio of T3/T4 is about double its normal value). Normal looking at birth and for the first few years, hypotonic (floppy), in particular difficulty to hold the head, possibly difficulty to thrive, possibly with delayed myelination (if so, some cases are reported with an MRI pattern similar to Pelizaeus–Merzbacher disease, known as PMD), possibly with decreased mitochondrial enzyme activities, possibly with fluctuating lactate level. Patients have an alert face, a limited IQ, patients may never talk/walk, 50% need feeding tube, patients have a normal life span. This disease can be ruled out with a simple TSH/T4/T3 thyroid test.

Model organisms

Mice 
A conditional knockout mouse line, called Slc16a2tm1a(KOMP)Wtsi was generated as part of the International Knockout Mouse Consortium program—a high-throughput mutagenesis project to generate and distribute animal models of disease to interested scientists.

Male and female animals underwent a standardized phenotypic screen to determine the effects of deletion. Twenty one tests were carried out on mutant mice and three significant abnormalities were observed. Female homozygote mutants had decreased circulating glucose levels. Male hemizygous mutants had an increased susceptibility to bacterial infection. Both sexes had various abnormal plasma chemistry parameters.

Zebrafish 
A knockout zebrafish line was generated in 2014 using the zinc-finger nuclease (ZFN)-mediated targeted gene editing system. Similar to human patients, the zebrafish larvae exhibited neurological and behavioral deficiencies. They demonstrated reduced locomotor activity, altered myelin-related genes and neuron-specific deficiencies in circuit formation.

Xenopus 
Expression of mct8 has been characterised in Xenopus laevis and Xenopus tropicalis.

See also 
 Solute carrier family

References

Further reading 

 
 
 
 
 
 
 
 
 
 
 
 
 
 

Solute carrier family
Genes mutated in mice